David Fergusson may refer to:

 David Fergusson (psychologist) (1944−2018), New Zealand professor of psychology
 David Fergusson (theologian) (born 1956), Scottish theologian

See also
 David Ferguson (disambiguation)